The following television stations broadcast on digital or analog channel 2 in Canada:

 CFCN-TV-16 in Oyen, Alberta
 CFJC-TV-19 in Pritchard, British Columbia
 CFRN-TV-5 in Lac La Biche, Alberta
 CHBX-TV in Sault Ste. Marie, Ontario
 CIII-TV-2 in Bancroft, Ontario
 CJCH-TV-5 in Sheet Harbour, Nova Scotia
 CKBQ-TV in Melfort, Saskatchewan
 CKND-TV-2 in Minnedosa, Manitoba
 CKPG-TV in Prince George, British Columbia
 CKPR-DT in Thunder Bay, Ontario
 CKSA-DT in Lloydminster, Alberta/Saskatchewan

The following television stations, which are no longer licensed, formerly broadcast on channel 2 in Canada:

 CIER-TV in Ear Falls, Ontario

02 TV stations in Canada